"Skinny Dipping" is a song recorded by American singer Sabrina Carpenter from her fifth studio album Emails I Can't Send (2022), included as the eleventh track of the album. The track was written by Carpenter, Julia Michaels, JP Saxe and its producer Leroy Clampitt. The song was released by Island Records as the lead single of the album on September 9, 2021.

Background and release 
On August 18, Carpenter shared a post with several clues from the song, including the mention of the first verse, "it'll be a Wednesday", in the post’s description, the lines "if we could take it all off and just exist?" and "water under the bridge". On August 23, Carpenter sends an email to her fans with the song’s codified title on a message and, later, posts a snippet of the song with the title revealed. On August 30, Carpenter finally reveals the single's cover art and release date. The song was released on September 9, along with its music video. It was written by Carpenter, Julia Michaels, JP Saxe and Leroy Clampitt in New York on Summer 2021.

Composition and lyrical interpretation
Musically, "Skinny Dipping" is a two minutes and fifty-eight seconds acoustic guitar-driven midtempo pop song. In terms of music notation, "Skinny Dipping" was composed using  common time in the key of E major, with a moderate tempo of 92 beats per minute. The song follows the chord progression of E–B-Amaj7-B. Carpenter's vocal performance on the verses in sung on a speaking style and her range spans, approximately, from the low note E3 to the high note of E5, giving the song about two octave of range.

Music video
The official music video was released along with the song and was directed by Amber Park. In the music video, Carpenter writes letters to herself and puts them in a box labeled "this too shall pass" and, at the end, after dancing barefoot in a green dress on the streets of New York, she throws the letters into the air. The letters putted in the box allude to the emails Carpenter wrote for herself, from which the inspiration for the songs on her album came. There are easter eggs to the follow-up single, "Fast Times", including the end of the music video where a different version of Carpenter riding a motorcycle appears, providing a snippet and a clue to the song's music video.

Live performances 
On October 29, 2021, Carpenter performed the song on The Tonight Show Starring Jimmy Fallon wearing a black and white gingham sequin dress, playing a Nord Electro 6D, and surrounded by band.

Track listing

Credits and personnel 
Recording and management
Recorded at Jungle City Studios (New York City)
Mastered at Sterling Sound (Edgewater, New Jersey)
Sabalicious Songs (BMI), Avant-Garde LOL/Honua c/o Kobalt (ASCAP), Good Deal Publishing (BMI), administered by Songs of Universal, Inc., Music By Work of Art (BMI)/Modern Arts Songs (BMI)/Songs of Starker Saxe (BMI)/Starkersaxesongs (SOCAN), administered by Sony/ATV Songs LLC (BMI)

Personnel

 Sabrina Carpenter – lead vocals, songwriting, backing vocals
 Leroy Clampitt – songwriting, production, recording, programming, bass, guitar, drums, keyboards, percussion
 Julia Michaels – songwriting
 JP Saxe – songwriting, guitar
 Josh Gudwin – mixing
 Alida Garpestad Peck – backing vocals
 Noah Conrad - trumpet
 Yi-Mei Templeman - cello
 Chris Gehringer – mastering

Credits adapted from Emails I Can't Send liner notes.

Release history

References 

2021 songs
2021 singles
Songs written by Julia Michaels
Sabrina Carpenter songs
Island Records singles
Songs written by Leroy Clampitt
Songs written by Sabrina Carpenter
Songs written by JP Saxe